Li Daozeng (January 19, 1930 – March 19, 2020) was a Chinese architect who was a professor and doctoral supervisor at Tsinghua University. He was a member of the Architectural Society of China.

Biography
Li was born in Shanghai, on January 19, 1930, while his ancestral home was in Hefei, Anhui. He secondary studied at Nanyang Model High School. In 1947 he was accepted to Tsinghua University, he studied electromechanics at the beginning, but switched to architecture a year later. After graduation, he taught at the university, where he was promoted to associate professor in 1979 and to full professor in 1983. He became director of the Department of Architecture in 1983 and dean of the School of Architecture in 1988. In 1993, he was hired as a visiting professor at Carnegie Mellon University in the United States. 

Li died on March 19, 2020, in Beijing at the age of 90.

Architectural works
 Beijing Tianqiao Theatre renovations 1993-2001
 National Centre for the Performing Arts (China) proposal 1958
 China Children Theatre, Beijing
 New Tsinghua School

Honours and awards
 1999 Member of the Chinese Academy of Engineering (CAE)

References

External links
 Li Daozeng on the Chinese Academy of Engineering

1930 births
2020 deaths
Engineers from Shanghai
Tsinghua University alumni
Academic staff of Tsinghua University
Chinese architects
Members of the Chinese Academy of Engineering